Raymond Eugene Willis (August 11, 1875March 21, 1956) was a United States senator from Indiana. Born in Waterloo, Indiana, he attended the public schools and graduated from Wabash College in 1896. He learned the printer's trade in Waterloo and moved to Angola, Indiana and engaged in the newspaper publishing business in 1898. He was postmaster of Angola from 1910 to 1914 and during the First World War he served as chairman of Steuben County Council of Defense, 1917-1918.

From 1919 to 1921, Willis was a member of the Indiana House of Representatives and was an unsuccessful candidate for election to the U.S. Senate in 1938, losing to moderate incumbent Democrat Frederick Van Nuys by about 5,100 votes; he was elected as a Republican to the Senate in 1940, narrowly unseating Democratic Sherman Minton, and served from January 3, 1941, to January 3, 1947. He was not a candidate for renomination in 1946 and resumed the publishing business as president of the Steuben Printing Co., and was also trustee of Tri-State University at Angola. He died in Angola in 1956; interment was in Circle Hill Cemetery.

References

External links
Raymond E Willis papers, Rare Books and Manuscripts, Indiana State Library

1875 births
1956 deaths
Republican Party members of the Indiana House of Representatives
Trine University people
Wabash College alumni
Republican Party United States senators from Indiana
People from DeKalb County, Indiana
People from Angola, Indiana
Indiana postmasters